Paulo Victor Rodrigues de Souza, known as Paulo Victor (born 22 March 1996) is a Brazilian football player. He plays for FC Langenegg.

Club career
He made his Austrian Football First League debut for SC Austria Lustenau on 21 July 2017 in a game against Floridsdorfer AC and scored twice after coming on as a half-time substitute.

References

External links
 

1996 births
Sportspeople from Bahia
Living people
Brazilian footballers
Clube Atlético Metropolitano players
SC Austria Lustenau players
Brazilian expatriate footballers
Expatriate footballers in Austria
2. Liga (Austria) players
Association football midfielders